Atractus matthewi is a species of snake in the family Colubridae. The species can be found in Venezuela.

References 

Atractus
Reptiles of Venezuela
Endemic fauna of Venezuela
Snakes of South America
Reptiles described in 2004